James Robert Bracey (born 3 May 1997) is an English cricketer who plays for Gloucestershire County Cricket Club.  He is a left-handed batsman, who also plays as a wicket-keeper. He made his first-class debut for Gloucestershire against Sussex in September 2016. He made his international debut for the England cricket team in June 2021. His brother, Sam, has also played first-class cricket.

Career
He made his List A debut on 21 April 2019, for Gloucestershire in the 2019 Royal London One-Day Cup. He made his T20 debut on 19 July 2019, for Gloucestershire against Glamorgan, in the 2019 t20 Blast.

On 29 May 2020, Bracey was named in a 55-man group of players to begin training ahead of international fixtures starting in England following the COVID-19 pandemic. On 17 June 2020, Bracey was included in England's 30-man squad to start training for the Test series against the West Indies, which was held behind closed doors  due to the COVID-19 pandemic. On 4 July 2020, Bracey was named as one of the nine reserve players for the first Test match of the series. He was retained as part of the squad for the following Test series against Pakistan. In the final Test of the series he played as a substitute fielder on the final day and caught Asad Shafiq off the bowling of captain Joe Root as the match finished in a draw.

In December 2020, Bracey was named as one of seven reserve players in England's Test squad for their series against Sri Lanka. In January 2021, he was also named as a reserve player in England's Test squad for their series against India. In May 2021, Bracey was named in England's Test squad for their series against New Zealand. Bracey made his Test debut on 2 June 2021, for England against New Zealand.

References

External links
 

1997 births
Living people
English cricketers
England Test cricketers
Cricketers from Bristol
Gloucestershire cricketers
Loughborough MCCU cricketers